The St. Michael of Scarborough was a ship of the Atlantic that was set to transport Scottish prisoners to the Thames, so that they could be transported by Ralph Williamson to Plantations of America and was mastered in 1678 by Edward Johnston. Williamson was likely headed for West Indies in 1679, but due to the longer than expected journey from Leith to the Thames, when he arrived, Williamson was nowhere to be found.   It is of some belief that the voyage never took place, and is said that the majority of the prisoners were released and made their way back to Scotland, and some were rearrested at a later date.

The majority of covenanters who were to be aboard the ship were confined in Glasgow and then moved to the Edinburgh Tolbooth when they refused to take an oath against their religion.

List of Scots to be Transported from Leith to American Plantations Aboard the St. Michael of Scarborough, 1678

This is a list of passengers on the St. Michael of Scarborough which left Leith Tolbooth on 12 December 1678, and likely arrived in the Thames in December of that Year.  It was compiled using sources from David Dobsons book regarding Scots Banished to the American Plantations, which makes reference to original sources from the Scottish Privy Council as well as others.

 Alexander Anderson, Covenanter
 John Anderson, Covenanter
 William Angus, Covenanter
 John Arnot, Covenanter
 David Barclay, Covenanter
 James Blackwood, Covenanter
 John Bowie, Covenanter
 James Braidwood, Covenanter
 James Brown, Covenanter
 John Brown, Covenanter
 Alexander Buchanan, Covenanter
 Andrew Buchanan, Covenanter
 John Cavers, Covenanter
 John Clark, Writer
 Richard Clydesdale, Covenanter
 Mungo Cochran, Covenanter
 John Cumin, Covenanter
 David Crosbie, Covenanter
 Robert Dicks, Covenanter
 Arthur Dougall, Covenanter
 John Fairbairn, Covenanter
 Alexander Findlay, Covenanter
 Edward Gay, Covenanter
 Thomas Govan, Covenanter
 William Govan, Covenanter
 John Graham
 Archibald Haddoway, Covenanter
 Mr John Harroway
 John Jervy
 David Kidd
 Donald McDonald
 Gilbert Marnock, Covenanter
 James Maxwell, Covenanter
 James Maxwell (younger), Covenanter
 Robert Maxwell, Covenanter
 James Miller, Covenanter
 William Niven
 Steven Porteous
 Robert Reid, Weaver
 Robert Reid, Cathcart
 William Steven, Covenanter
 Alexander Stewart, Covenanter
 Adam Stobie, Covenanter
 William Temple
 John Yeaman, Covenanter
 William Yeaman, Covenanter

References

Prison ships
1670s ships